Southern Railway 385 is a preserved steam locomotive built in November 1907 by the Baldwin Locomotive Works for Southern Railway in the United States. It is a 2-8-0 "Consolidation" type of Southern's "H-4" class. She is also a sister locomotive to Southern No. 401.

History
In No. 385's last years on the Southern, it worked on the Richmond Division hauling branch line mixed trains. On November 17, 1952, after a 45 year career on the Southern, No. 385 was sold to the Virginia Blue Ridge Railway and was renumbered to 6. The shortline put the engine on standby service in 1956 and on April 1, 1959, the engine was officially retired.

In 1963, the locomotive was sold to Earle H. Gil Sr. who restored it to run on the Morris County Central Railroad. The locomotive ran on the MCCRR hauling excursion trains until the MCCRR's defunction on October 14, 1978. In 1982, the Delaware Otsego Corporation (the parent company of the NYS&W) acquired the assets of the Morris County Central, including No. 385. The DO / NYS&W had early plans to restore No. 385 to operation and run her over their lines in excursion service, but this did not come to pass. After many years of subsequent storage, and taking on the sad patina of neglect, the Delaware Otsego donated the locomotive to the Bergen County Vocational & Technical High School in Hackensack, New Jersey in June 1990.

In October 1990, Joseph Supor, Jr., the founder of J. Supor & Son Trucking & Rigging Co., Inc. donated the cost of trucking No. 385 nearly 2 miles from the rails of the NYS&W to Bergen Tech, where the locomotive was lifted into place on a panel of display track in an area adjacent to the school athletic field, alongside the Hackensack River. By 1999, the direction had changed drastically at Bergen Tech, when the “Stationary Steam Course” (which had been established in 1952) was totally eliminated and all facets of the program were disassembled and removed. Reportedly, preparations were being made to immediately dispose of No. 385 by scrapping her.

At this point, Joseph Supor Sr. became aware of the dire situation and bought the locomotive at the very last minute, as it was due to be cut up within hours of his acquisition. Mr. Supor's rigging crew carefully removed No. 385 from the schoolyard and trucked the locomotive to his facility in Harrison, New Jersey.	

Mr. Supor stored No. 385 with intentions of cosmetically restoring the locomotive for display at his company headquarters. Unfortunately, this never occurred, although there were many discussions on what to do to preserve this unique relic from our Nation's Industrial past.

In 2007, Joseph Supor Jr., the son of Joseph Supor Sr., donated the No. 385 to the Whippany Railway Museum in Whippany, New Jersey, where it sits on static display. In 2021, the Whippany Railway Museum repainted 385 into the green and gold paint scheme that it used to wore for the Morris County Central Railroad.

References

External links
 Photograph

Individual locomotives of the United States
2-8-0 locomotives
Steam locomotives of Southern Railway (U.S.)
Baldwin locomotives
Railway locomotives introduced in 1907
Standard gauge locomotives of the United States
Preserved steam locomotives of New Jersey